The Taunton Stop Line was a World War II defensive line in southwest England. It was designed "to stop an enemy's advance from the west and in particular a rapid advance supported by armoured fighting vehicles (up to the size of a German medium tank) which may have broken through the forward defences."

History
The Taunton Stop Line was one of more than fifty similar defensive lines that were constructed around England in WWII, all designed to compartmentalise the country to contain any breakthrough until reinforcements could arrive. Stop Lines used a combination of geography and construction to make continuous defences. The innermost and longest was the GHQ Line. They were constructed as part of a package of field fortifications planned under the leadership of General Sir Edmund Ironside, the newly appointed Commander-in-Chief, Home Forces.

The Taunton Stop Line ran north–south for nearly  through Somerset, Dorset and Devon, from Seaton to Axminster to Chard along the River Axe, then along the Great Western Railway to Ilminster, the railway and Chard Canal to Taunton, the Bridgwater and Taunton Canal to Bridgwater, and the River Parrett to the coast near Highbridge. Highbridge was also the starting point for the east–west GHQ Line.

Aside from the obstacles created by canals, rivers and railway embankments, by early 1942 the line was defended by 309 light machine gun pillboxes, (typically for the Bren gun), 61 medium machine gun emplacements (typically for the Vickers machine gun), 21 static anti-tank gun emplacements (equipped with ex-World War I naval six-pound guns), along with numerous anti-tank obstacles in the form of concrete posts, cubes and pyramids, while charge chambers were cut into bridges ready for demolition. Other armaments used included Boys Anti-tank Rifle and mobile QF 2 pounder guns.

To reinforce the line and deny access to the major east–west routes that passed through the line, in 1941 twelve "Defensive Islands" were added to the line under a plan devised by General Brooke, who succeeded General Sir Edmund Ironside.  These included Bridgwater and Creech St Michael.

Two divisions from GHQ Home Forces Reserve were originally assigned to man the line, although from the autumn of 1940 the Home Guard were increasingly used.

Many pillboxes can still be seen along the length of the line.

Gallery

See also
 British anti-invasion preparations of World War II
 British hardened field defences of World War II
 GHQ Line
 Coquet Stop Line
 Outer London Defence Ring
 Bridgwater and Taunton Canal
 Ringwood West Line

References

External links
 UK Invasion Defence Remains
 "The Stop Line Way Multi-user Path Seaton to Colyford and Cloakham Lawn to Weycroft East Devon" – An Archaeological Desk-based Assessment (part 1) and (part 2)
 

Taunton
British World War II defensive lines
Historic defensive lines
Military history of Somerset
Buildings and structures in Somerset
History of Taunton